Illegal immigration to Brazil is the entry in Brazil of foreign nationals without government permission, and in violation of the Brazilian immigration laws.

As the country's economy improves it has found itself a magnet for illegal immigration. Many illegal immigrants have arrived particularly from Haiti and Bolivia.

Brazil often creates special legalization procedures for immigrant groups who become too numerous and would not otherwise qualify for immigration. As of 2022, Brazil allows practically unrestricted immigration for nationals of all South American countries, Afghanistan, Haiti, Syria and Ukraine, for nationals of Cuba who participated in a medical training program in Brazil, and for nationals of the Dominican Republic and Senegal who claim refugee status (without analyzing the refugee claim).

See also
Immigration to Brazil
Visa policy of Brazil

References

Immigration to Brazil
Brazil
Brazilian immigration law
Brazil